We Monsters is a 2015 German drama film directed by Sebastian Ko. It was screened in the Discovery section of the 2015 Toronto International Film Festival.

Cast
 Mehdi Nebbou as Paul
 Ulrike C. Tscharre as Christine
 Janina Fautz as Sarah
 Ronald Kukulies as Kuszinsky

Remake

The film's English-language remake, The Lie, premiered at the 2018 Toronto International Film Festival.

References

External links
 

2015 films
2015 drama films
2010s German-language films
German drama films
2010s German films